Manikdoh Dam, is a gravity dam on Kukadi River near Junnar, Pune district in state of Maharashtra in India.

Specifications
The dam is located in the Ghod basin and is part of the Kukadi project, which constructed five dams in the region. Other dams included in this project are Yedgaon Dam, Pimpalgaon Joge Dam, Dimbhe Dam and Wadaj Dam. A 6 MW power house is also built at the foot of this dam.

Purpose
 Irrigation 
 Hydroelectricity

See also

 Dams in Maharashtra
 List of reservoirs and dams in India

References

Dams in Pune district
Dams completed in 1984
Hydroelectric power stations in Maharashtra
1984 establishments in Maharashtra
20th-century architecture in India